Badiaria plagiostrigata is a species of moth of the family Tortricidae. It is found in Ecuador (Morona-Santiago Province).

The ground colour of the forewings is pale ferruginous, sprinkled and dotted with brown. The markings are dark rust brown. The hindwings are dirty cream, spotted with greyish.

Etymology
The species name refers to the oblique lineation of the forewings and is derived from Greek plagios (meaning oblique).

References

External links

Moths described in 2006
Endemic fauna of Ecuador
Euliini
Moths of South America
Taxa named by Józef Razowski